The Amatis Trio is a piano trio formed in 2014 in Amsterdam. It is one of the few full-time piano trios in Europe. The ensemble was named a BBC New Generation Artist in 2016 and named in the ECHO Rising Stars in 2018 after being selected by Konzerthaus Dortmund, Elbphilharmonie Hamburg, Festspielhaus Baden-Baden and Kölner Philharmonie. In 2019, the trio was appointed Resident Chamber Ensemble at Cambridge University. The Amatis Trio now plays at major festivals such as the BBC Proms, Edingburgh International Festival and concert venues including Konzerthaus Berlin, Wigmore Hall London, Elbphilharmonie Hamburg and Alte Oper Frankfurt. The ensemble has performed Beethoven's Triple Concerto with the Royal Philharmonic Orchestra, BBC National Orchestra of Wales and Frankfurter Opern- und Museumsorchester.

In 2019, following the release of their debut CD of Enescu, Ravel and Britten, the trio was named as Gramophone magazine's "One To Watch".

Lea Hausmann and Samuel Shepherd play on a violin and cello made by Jean-Baptiste Vuillaume, loaned by Beare's Violin Society London.

Awards 
 2020: Borletti-Buitoni Trust (BBT) Fellowship Award
 2019: Het Kersjes Fonds – Kersjesprijs
 2018: BBC Radio 3 New Generation Artists
 2016: Wigmore Hall Parkhouse Award
 2015: Dutch Classical Talent

Discography 
 2019 Piano trios by Enescu, Ravel and Britten (CAvi Music Records)

Members 
 Lea Hausmann (violin)
 Samuel Shepherd (violoncello)
 Andrei Gologan (piano) - from September 2021 replacing Mengjie Han

References

External links

Dutch classical music groups
Piano trios